The United Theological College (UTC) is an Australian theological college and a founding member of Charles Sturt University's School of Theology. As well as providing undergraduate and postgraduate degrees in all areas of theology, the UTC trains ministry candidates for the Uniting Church in Australia Synod of New South Wales and Australian Capital Territory.

Background 
The college describes its teaching as grounded in the evangelical and Reformed traditions of the Christian faith. Since 2016, the UTC has been home to the Alan Walker Lectureship in Mission, Evangelism and Leadership.

History 
United Theological College came into being on 1 July 1974 by resolution of the Congregational Union, the Methodist Church and the Presbyterian Church in New South Wales. The first courses commenced in February 1975. United Theological College is the successor to the former United Faculty of Theology which, for over 50 years, was a joint arrangement between Camden College, Leigh College and St Andrew’s Theological Hall, the theological colleges of the three denominations. In 1977, when the Congregational, Methodist and Presbyterian Churches united to form the Uniting Church in Australia (UCA), United Theological College became the theological college of the NSW Synod of the Uniting Church.

Camden Theological Library 
The United Theological College is on the same site as the Camden Theological Library, the library of the New South Wales and ACT Synod of the Uniting Church.The library holds an expansive collection of theological books and resources. One of the special features of the collection is a wide-ranging collection of theological books in Korean.

May MacLeod lecture series 
The endowed May Macleod lecture series has taken place at UTC since 1987. Some past lecturers include:
 Prof John Swinton
 Prof David L. Clough
 Prof Sathianathan Clarke
 Ciaron O’Reilly
 Dr Pete Rollins
 Dr Deirdre Palmer
 Prof James Torrance.

Notable former faculty 
 Right Rev’d Prof. Stephen Pickard, systematic theologian and bishop
 Prof. Christopher Mostert, systematic theologian
 Rev’d. Assoc. Prof. William Emilsen, church historian
 Rev’d. Dr. Jione Havea, Old Testament scholar and Pasifika theologian
 Rev’d. Dr. Dean Drayton, missiologist and former President of the Uniting Church
 Rev’d Dr. John Squires, New Testament scholar
 Rev’d. Dr. Graham Hughes, liturgist and theologian
 Rev’d. Dr. Robert Maddox, New Testament scholar
 Rev’d. Prof. Howard Wallace, Old Testament scholar
 Dr Benjamin Myers, systematic theologian

College principals 
The current principal of the college is Rev’d Dr Peter Walker. Past principals include:
 Rev'd Dr. Graheme Ferguson
 Rev’d Dr. Gordon Dicker
 Rev’d Dr. Sarah Mitchell
 Rev’d Assoc Prof. Clive Pearson

References 

Uniting Church in Australia
Australian tertiary institutions
Seminaries and theological colleges in Australia
Seminaries and theological colleges in New South Wales